William Mark Welch (12 August 1911 – 25 May 1940) was an Australian first-class cricketer and British Army officer. He played first-class cricket on four occasions for the Free Foresters, before serving in the Second World War, during which he was killed in action at the Siege of Calais in May 1940.

Life and military service
The son of William Alfred Welch and Jessie Isabella Welch (née Mark), he was born at Brisbane. He was sent to England to be educated, where he attended Harrow School. While at Harrow he was a cadet and after leaving he was commissioned as a second lieutenant in the Artists Rifles in May 1933. He made his debut in first-class cricket for the Free Foresters against Cambridge University at Fenner's in 1935. On debut he took figures of 5 for 43 in the Cambridge first-innings. He made three further first-class appearances for the Free Foresters, all against Cambridge University in 1936, 1937 and 1939. He scored a total of 170 runs across his four matches, at an average of 34.00. He made one century score, making 104 in the 1939 fixture. With his right-arm off break and medium pace bowling, he took 8 wickets at a bowling average of 27.62.

He was promoted to the rank of lieutenant while still serving in the Artists Rifles in May 1936, He served during the Second World War, having been transferred to the Rifle Brigade. He was sent to France during the German invasion to aid in the defence of Calais and Dunkirk. Disembarking from the SS Archangel at Dunkirk, he quickly found himself in action. Faced with the advance of the 10th Panzer Division, The Rifles retreated behind the old walls of Calais and were besieged. Welch was killed in action on 25 May 1940, while attempting to retake a bridge captured by the advancing Germans. His body was recovered and was buried at the Calais Southern Cemetery.

References

External links

1911 births
1940 deaths
Burials in France
People from Brisbane
People educated at Harrow School
London Regiment officers
Australian cricketers
Free Foresters cricketers
Rifle Brigade officers
British Army personnel killed in World War II
Military personnel from Brisbane